"Amantes o Amigos" is a song by Puerto Rican recording artist Khriz John. It was released as John's debut single on 8 February 2011. The official remix, which features vocals performed by Puerto Rican recording artist Ivy Queen, was released on 10 June 2011.

Charts

References

2011 singles
Ivy Queen songs
2011 songs